Year 1144 (MCXLIV) was a leap year starting on Saturday (link will display the full calendar) of the Julian calendar.

Events 
 By place 

 Levant 
 Autumn – Imad al-Din Zengi, Seljuk governor (atabeg) of Mosul, attacks the Artuqid forces led by Kara Arslan – who has made an alliance with Joscelin II, count of Edessa. In support of the alliance Joscelin marches out of Edessa with a Crusader army down to the Euphrates River, to cut off Zengi's communications with Aleppo. Zengi is informed by Muslim observers at Harran of Joscelin's movements. He sends a detachment to ambush the Crusaders and reaches Edessa with his main army in late November.
 December 24 – Siege of Edessa: Seljuk forces led by Imad al-Din Zengi conquer the fortress city of Edessa after a four-week siege. Thousands of inhabitants are massacred – only the Muslims are spared. The women and children are sold into slavery. Lacking the forces to take on Zengi, Joscelin II retires to his fortress at Turbessel. There, he request reinforcements from the Byzantines and Queen-Regent Melisende of Jerusalem.

 Europe 
 Spring – Italo-Norman forces under King Roger II of Sicily invade the Papal States to force Pope Lucius II to accept his truce, but the patrician Giordano Pierleoni, brother of the late Antipope Anacletus II, leads the Roman populace to proclaim a constitutional republic free of papal authority with regard to civil rule. Pierleoni takes over the papal capital, and establishes the Commune of Rome in the style of the old Roman Republic.
 Summer – Geoffrey V (the Fair) completes his conquest of Normandy, which comes under Angevin control. In exchange for being recognised as Duke of Normandy by King Louis VII of France, Geoffrey surrenders half of the county of Vexin – a region vital to Norman security – to Louis.
 The city of Montauban in southern France is founded by Count Alfonso Jordan of Toulouse.
 The city of Ljubljana (modern Slovenia) is first mentioned in historical records.

 England 
 Autumn – Geoffrey de Mandeville, 1st Earl of Essex, is mortally wounded by a stray arrow received in a skirmish. Because he is an outlaw, his burial is denied at the monastery he has founded, Walden Abbey. Geoffrey's body is eventually accepted by the Knights Templar community for burial within the Temple Church in London.

 Africa 
 Catalan mercenary Reverter de La Guardia, the main Almoravid commander in the Maghrid al-Aqsa, dies. His elimination opens the regions to the troops of the Almohads.

 By topic 

 Religion 
 March 8 – Pope Celestine II dies at Rome after a 5-month pontificate. He is succeeded by Lucius II as the 166th pope of the Catholic Church.
 March 22 – The first example of an anti-Semitic blood libel is recorded in England, in connection with the murder of William of Norwich.
 June 11 – The Basilica of St. Denis near Paris is completed, and consecrated in the presence of Louis VII – as the first Gothic church.
 The Lesmahagow Priory in Scotland, is founded after John, bishop of Glasgow, and King David I have granted lands at Lesmahagow.
 The first Knights Templar stronghold is established in the Kingdom of León and Castile.

Births 
 August 11 – Sinjong, Korean ruler of Goryeo (d. 1204)
 Li Fengniang, Chinese empress of the Song Dynasty (d. 1200)
 Maria Komnene, queen of Hungary and Croatia (d. 1190)
 Matsudono Motofusa, Japanese nobleman (d. 1230)
 Minamoto no Tomonaga, Japanese samurai (d. 1160)
 Taira no Tadanori, Japanese military leader (d. 1184)

Deaths 
 March 8 – Celestine II, pope of the Catholic Church
 March 22 – William of Norwich, English child saint (b. 1132)
 May 23 – Petronilla of Lorraine, countess of Holland (b. 1082)
 June 12 – Al-Zamakhshari, Persian philosopher (b. 1075)
 July 17 – Abu Mansur Mauhub al-Jawaliqi, Arab philologist (b. 1074)
 July 27 – Salomea of Berg, High Duchess of Poland (b. 1099)
 October 10 – Alfonso of Capua, Italo-Norman nobleman (b. 1120)
 December 24 – Hugh II (or Hugo), archbishop of Edessa
 September – Geoffrey de Mandeville, English nobleman 
 Abu Tahir Marwazi, Persian philosopher and scientist
 Berenguer Raymond (or Ramon), French nobleman (b. 1115)
 Matthew of Edessa (or Matteos), Armenian historian 
 Rahere (or Raherius), Norman priest (approximate date)
 Reverter de La Guardia, viscount of Barcelona (or 1142)
 Zhu Bian, Chinese diplomat, poet and writer (b. 1085)

References